Jean-Pierre Jaussaud (3 June 1937 – 22 July 2021) was a French racing driver, noted for winning the 24 Hours of Le Mans in 1978 and 1980.

Jaussaud was born in Caen, Calvados, and started racing in automobiles in 1962, taking courses in the Jim Russell Drivers School and the Winfield Racing School. In 1964, he graduated to Formula Three racing, with backing from Shell, and joined the works Matra team in 1966, where he stayed for two years, and won the French title in 1970, in a private Tecno.

In 1971 he moved full-time to Formula Two in a works March, and the following year drove a privateer Brabham and fought for the European Formula 2 title with Mike Hailwood. In 1975 Jaussaud quit single-seaters and entered endurance racing, where he was invited to drive for Renault Sport starting in 1976. Two years later, Jaussaud and partner Didier Pironi won the 24 Hours of Le Mans race overall.

Although he tested the Renault F1 car, Jaussaud instead stayed in touring cars and endurance, winning the 1979 Production title in a Triumph Dolomite. Teaming up with Jean Rondeau, he won at Le Mans once more, and also took part in the Paris-Dakar Rally for Rondeau's team. Jaussaud continued racing until 1992, when he retired to become a racing instructor. Jaussaud died in Caen on 22 July 2021 at the age of 84.

24 Hours of Le Mans results

References

Official web site
Jean-Pierre Jaussaud - Les Grands Pilotes

1937 births
2021 deaths
Sportspeople from Caen
French racing drivers
European Formula Two Championship drivers
French Formula Three Championship drivers
24 Hours of Le Mans drivers
24 Hours of Le Mans winning drivers
Dakar Rally drivers
World Sportscar Championship drivers
British Formula One Championship drivers
24 Hours of Spa drivers

12 Hours of Reims drivers